Matthew Russell (born 17 January 1978) is an English former footballer who played in the Football League for Scarborough, Doncaster Rovers and Halifax Town.

External links
 

English footballers
English Football League players
1978 births
Living people
Scarborough F.C. players
Doncaster Rovers F.C. players
Halifax Town A.F.C. players
Association football defenders